This is a list of Roman Catholic bishops of Kyiv. For Greek Catholic bishops of Kyiv, see List of Major Archbishops of Kyiv-Halych.

Roman Catholic bishops of Kyiv diocese include:

1320–1334 Henryk, missionary bishop
1350–1378 Jakub, missionary bishop
1378–1383 Mikołaj, missionary bishop
Borzysław  1375–1420, missionary bishop
1405–1410 Filip
1410–1429 Michał Trestka
1430 Stanisław z Buzowa
1431-? Stanisław Martini
Andrzej d. 1434
Jan   1421–1466
1449–1473 Klemens 1423–1473
1477–1483 Jan
1487–1494 Michał
1520–1524 Jan Filipowicz 1480–1537
1526–1531 Mikołaj Wieżgajło
1532–1533 Jerzy Talat
1534–1536 Franciszek  1506–1551
Jan Andruszewicz  1515–1570
1564–1572 Mikołaj Pac 1527–1585
1592–1598 Józef Wereszczyński  1592–1598
1599–1618 Krzysztof Kazimierski  1572–1618
1619–1633 Bogusław Radoszewski 1577–1633
1633–1635 Andrzej Szołdrski 1633–1635
1646–1653 Stanisław Zaremba
1655–1656 Jan Leszczyński
1656–1677 Tomasz Ujejski
1679–1682 Jan Stanisław Witwicki
1683–1692 Andrzej Chryzostom Załuski 1650–1711
Jarosław Sokołowski  1656–1701
1697–1699 Mikołaj Święcicki
1700–1711 Jan Paweł Sariusz-Gomoliński  1667–1711
1715–1718 Walenty Maciej Arcemberski 1674–1717
1718–1723 Jan Joachim Tarło
1723–1756 Jan Samuel Ożga d. 1756
1756–1759 Kajetan Sołtyk 1715–1788
1759–1774 Józef Andrzej Załuski 1702–1774
1774–1784 Ignacy Franciszek Ossoliński 1730–1784
1784–1798 Kasper Cieciszowski 1745–1831

Bishops of Kyiv-Zhytomyr 
Jan Purwiński

Notes:
 the above dates are birth-death dates, not office terms.
 Kyiv diocese was created in 1397; in 1798 it was merged with Lutsk diocese forming the Zhytomyr diocese which in 1991 became the diocese of Kyiv-Zhytomyr

See also
Bishop of Kyiv (disambiguation)
Ukrainian Catholic Archeparchy of Kyiv